Eucommiales is an order of flowering plants. This order was recognised in the Cronquist system, placed in the subclass Hamamelidae [sic], as  consisting of a single species: Eucommia ulmoides.

Historically recognized angiosperm orders